Garfield: Caught in the Act is a 1995 side-scrolling platform game developed and published by Sega for the Genesis. Versions for the Game Gear and Microsoft Windows were also released. It is based upon Jim Davis' comic strip cat, Garfield, and draws inspiration from Davis' 1984 book Garfield: His 9 Lives. Odie scares Garfield while they are watching television and they fall on the TV, breaking it. Both characters attempt to repair it before Jon Arbuckle catches them; however, the thrown spare parts become an electronic monster known as the Glitch, transporting Garfield into the TV, where he must defeat him in order to get out.

Garfield: Caught in the Act was met with mixed reception from critics.

Gameplay 

Garfield: Caught in the Act is a side-scrolling platform game where players take control of the titular cat across levels of varying themes on the television in order to defeat an evil electronic being known as the Glitch and escape the TV.

The levels, though linear in nature, are large and populated with obstacles, enemies and environmental hazards, inviting the player to traverse the stage by running, jumping, climbing, swinging, throwing objects or dodging enemies. Later levels become more maze-like and exploratory, making the player take different routes to reach the end, where a boss must be fought to progress further. There are two types of bonus rounds, one of which resembles a Whac-A-Mole game. Each time the player defeats a boss, Garfield takes a commercial break where he rockets through the Television Wasteland, trying for an extra life or a continue.

Garfield is able to attack enemies up close or throw objects at them (close-range weapons and objects thrown change between each level). Enemies consist of ghosts, piranhas, crabs, bulldogs and mummified mice, among others. All levels also contain beneficial items and weapon ammunition to be collected for Garfield, among other secrets to be found. If Garfield is defeated, he respawns on the nearest checkpoint reached. Once all lives are lost, the game is over, though players have the option of resuming progress from the beginning of the last level reached by using continues or loading a saved game via password.

Plot 
The general plot summary of Garfield: Caught in the Act is shared between each version of the game. Odie scares Garfield while he is watching television, and he ends up falling on the television. In a rushed effort to repair the television before Jon catches them, Garfield and Odie attempt to put the banged up and broken pieces together. Without so much as a screwdriver, Garfield quickly reassembles the television, minus a part or two. As Garfield throws away the spare pieces, they become an electronic monster known as the Glitch. The Glitch transports Garfield into the television and now he must defeat the Glitch to make his way out.

Production

Background 

Plans for a Garfield game on Sega Genesis came into existence with the rise of licensed platform titles such as Disney's Aladdin by Virgin Games. Development on Garfield: Caught in the Act originally began with programmer Steven Lashower, who worked on the Sega 32X conversion of Star Wars Arcade, but internal development issues led to the project being restarted during Christmas 1994 and months of work being scrapped as a result, with Michael Fernie now serving as lead programmer instead alongside Ala Diaz and Pravin Wagh.

Michael Fernie was a former Absolute Entertainment member who left the company and joined Sega to work on a 32X project titled Ratchet and Bolt but due to Sega interActive focusing on releasing Eternal Champions: Challenge from the Dark Side, his team and the project made no progress until he was transferred with the Star Wars Arcade staff and was asked to take over Garfield: Caught in the Act, which was facing a turbulent creation cycle. Pravin Wagh was hired by Lashower after Sega purchased the company that later became Sega interActive, while Petra Evers joined Sega due to her background as concept artist and designer, with the title marking her debut in the video game industry.

Development 

Garfield: Caught in the Act on Sega Genesis was developed by most of the same team that worked on Star Wars Arcade for the 32X at Sega interActive simultaneously with the Game Gear port by Novotrade International, with Michael Latham and Eric Quakenbush serving as producers of each version respectively. Michael Fernie, Pravin Wagh and Petra Evers recounted about the game's development process and history through online interviews. Both Fernie and Wagn claimed that although the project had already been extensively planned via game design documents, many of the original ideas were scrapped due to not being fun such as the train segment in "Catsablanca", which was implemented early but ultimately deemed not satisfactory for the final version.

Other levels in varying degrees of completing were also removed from the original Genesis version such as "Alien Landscape", which was created by Evers and based on a lava lamp, as well as a minigame that involved players picking cheese from a mouse hole. Fernie stated that the marketing team at Sega requested "Count Slobula's Castle" to be the first level of the game, instead of "Cave Cat 3,000,000 BC", with Fernie regarding the former level as one of the weaker stages that likely put off players from seeing the entire game.

All the sprites and hand-drawn animation in Garfield: Caught in the Act were created by Jim Davis and the artists at Paws, while Sega interActive transposed the sketches lent by the studio into pixel art graphics, with Fernie stating that the person who did the process was a subcontractor. The game drew inspiration from Davis' 1984 book Garfield: His 9 Lives. Davis noted that the concept for his book allowed them to portray Garfield as more "kinetic" than his usual newspaper strip character, facilitating the book's adaptation into an hour-long TV special, and reasoned that a similar premise would allow a more effective translation of Garfield into the video game medium. Davis also stated he was responsible for creating both the cover art and the introduction sequence.

Release 
Garfield: Caught in the Act was first released for the Sega Genesis in 1995 by Sega and featured six levels. This version was also distributed in Brazil by Tectoy. Sega Channel subscribers could download Garfield: The Lost Levels, an exclusive release for the service that featured three different levels. A port for the Sega 32X, called Garfield in TV Land, was planned but ultimately cancelled.

Game Gear 
The Game Gear version of Garfield: Caught in the Act, developed by Novotrade International and published by Sega in North America and Europe, includes eight levels in total, two of which appear in the Lost Levels ("Bonehead the Barbarian" and "Slobbin Hood"). There is only one type of bonus stage (accessed by finding an icon of Arlene's face in each level), in which the player must wreck everything in Jon's living room within a time limit to get an extra life. Garfield does not have different outfits in each level, and the attacks are the same in all levels (his close-range is a punch, and the projectile are stones). There are no invincibility items. In the between-level segments, Garfield does not take damage from the obstacles; instead, they teleport him back to the start of that segment. Like the Genesis original, the Game Gear version was also distributed in Brazil by Tectoy.

PC 
The PC port was developed by Point of View, Inc. and first released by Sega in March 1996. There is one new level similar to one of the Sega Channel's Lost levels ("Alien Landscape"), while the remaining levels are presented in a different order than on the Genesis original. The PC port was also re-released in the Sonic & Garfield Pack, along with Sonic & Knuckles Collection and Baku Baku Animal. The PC version is titled Garfield in TV Land! on the box art but Caught in the Act is the ingame title.

Reception 

Critical reception for Garfield: Caught in the Act has been generally mixed. Reviewing the Genesis version, the four reviewers of Electronic Gaming Monthly praised the graphics and animation, but all but one of them felt these were outweighed by the loose controls and large number of mandatory hits. GamePro similarly commented that "colorful backgrounds and big sprites will charm cartoon lovers", but that Garfield's slow movement and weak moves make the game too frustrating. They concluded, "Fans of the comic strip might enjoy this platform title. The tedious gameplay and hopeless controls will disgruntle anyone else." Sega Saturn Magazine (previously Sega Magazine) criticized the bland backgrounds and sluggish control and summarized that "Once you've overcome the novelty of eliciting any movement from the world's most notorious sleep junkie, you're left with a fairly unoriginal platformer". In a retrospective review of the Genesis version, AllGame editor Brett Alan Weiss praised the "cute cartoon-like" graphics, furthermore stating "Odie, Jon, and the gang all look like themselves, and Garfield is as orange and as fat as ever", but described the game as "an average and unimaginative action game that's cute but not very funny".

Reviewing the Game Gear version, GamePro was pleased with how well the player character recreates Garfield's look and behavior, commenting that, "Garfield's mugs and shrugs are funny and, dare we say it, cute." They concluded that the game, though simplistic and "hardly game of the year", would be a good experience for a younger or beginning gamer.

References

Notes

Footnotes

External links 
 Garfield: Caught in the Act at MobyGames
 Garfield: Caught in the Act at GameFAQs
 Garfield: Caught in the Act at Giant Bomb

1995 video games
Appaloosa Interactive games
Cancelled Sega 32X games
Game Gear games
Pack-in video games
Sega Genesis games
Side-scrolling platform games
Single-player video games
Video games based on Garfield
Video games developed in the United States
Video games scored by Tristan des Prés
Video games set in Egypt 
Video games set in prehistory 
Windows games